Kashipur Multilateral High School is a secondary school located in Khashipur Bazar, Sonaimuri Upazila, Noakhali District in south-eastern Bangladesh. It was established in 1957.

Facilities 
The school facilities include a science laboratory as required for SSC examinations, and a library with audio-visual equipment.

Programs 
Extra-curricular activities include drama, debating, and public speaking. School teams participate in inter-school and national competitions. Theatrical presentations are given in both English and Bengali.

Other activities pursued by students include field trips, visits to exhibitions and museums, celebration of important national and historical events, and cultural programs. Participation in Community Service Programs, fund raising for natural disaster relief and campaigns to enhance awareness of health and environmental issues are also a part of school activities.

Sports 
A sports program is part of the curriculum. All the school buildings have playing areas, and teachers supervise games classes. Senior Section students will use the facilities of the modern School Sports Complex shortly to be completed.

References 

Educational institutions established in 1957
Schools in Noakhali District
High schools in Bangladesh
1957 establishments in East Pakistan
Sonaimuri Upazila